Words and Music may refer to:

Film and television
Words and Music (1929 film), a musical directed by James Tinling
Words & Music, a 1931 musical short film starring Ruth Etting
Words and Music (1948 film), based on the lives of Richard Rodgers and Lorenz Hart
Words and Music (Canadian game show), a 1966 Canadian television game show series hosted by Jim Perry
Words and Music (American game show), a 1970 American game show hosted by Wink Martindale
Words and Music (TV series), an Australian television series

Theatre
Words and Music (musical), a 1932 London musical revue by Noël Coward, later performed on Broadway as Set to Music
Words and Music (play), a 1962 play by Samuel Beckett
Words and Music, a 1974 revue written by and starring lyricist Sammy Cahn

Music

Albums
Words and Music (Roger Miller album), a 1966 album
Words and Music (Jimmy Webb album), a 1970 album
Words & Music, a 1971 comedy album by Benny Hill
Words and Music (Tavares album), a 1983 album
Words and Music (Mark Eitzel album), a 1996 album
Words and Music (Paul Kelly album), a 1998 album
Words and Music (Glen Campbell album), a 2006 album
Words and Music, a 2007 album by Richard Rodney Bennett
Words and Music (Aqualung album), a 2008 album
Words & Music (Planxty album), a 1983 album
Words & Music (Aphex Twin album), a 1994 promotional CD
A 1997 interview CD with Loreena McKennitt, discussing her 1997 album The Book of Secrets
Words & Music: John Mellencamp's Greatest Hits, a 2004 album
Words & Music (Swingle II album), the second album by Swingle II

Songs
"Words and Music" (song), by Andy Gibb

Other
Words and Music: A History of Pop in the Shape of a City, a 2005 book by Paul Morley

See also
Words and Music by Saint Etienne, a 2012 album by Saint Etienne
Words and Music By..., a 1919 silent film starring Elinor Fair
Music and Words, an album by Malcolm Middleton
Music and Lyrics, a 2007 film